Annie Rebekah Smith (March 16, 1828 – July 26, 1855) was an early American Seventh-day Adventist hymnist, and sister of the Adventist pioneer Uriah Smith.

She has three hymns in the current (6,8,&9 below), and had 10 hymns in the previous Seventh-day Adventist Church Hymnal.

Biography

Annie Rebekah Smith was the third child of four children and only daughter of Samuel and Rebekah (Spalding) Smith. She was born in West Wilton, New Hampshire, on Sunday March 16, 1828. At ten years of age, she accepted Jesus as her Saviour.

Millerite Adventist

In 1844, she embraced the doctrine of the soon coming of Christ. At sixteen years of age, she experienced the Great Disappointment of October 22, 1844. Afterwards, she lost interest in the Adventist teachings and pursued her favorite occupations of studying and teaching.

Education in Boston

Between 1844 and 1855 she taught in seven district schools. At the same time she furthered her own education in various schools including six terms at the Ladies' Female Seminary in Charlestown, Massachusetts, near Boston. At the Charlestown Seminary she trained to be a teacher in Oil Painting and French.

Annie meets Joseph Bates

Sabbatarian Adventist pioneer Joseph Bates met with Annie's mother. He was going to Boston and encouraged her to get Annie to attend the meeting he was conducting there. She went to the meeting and met Bates. This sparked her interest in the sabbatarian Adventist movement.

Working for the Review and Herald

Subsequent to having written and submitted a poem to the Review and Herald, she was recognised by James White as a talented writer. Although her eyesight was not sufficient to work as a copy-editor, she accepted the position. Upon arriving in Saratoga Springs, New York, she was healed through "anointing and prayer"

During the  three and a half years before her death, she contributed around 45 articles to the Review and Herald and to the Youth's Instructor.
She also wrote how far from home

Annie and John

John Nevins Andrews worked at the Review office during this time. A romance developed between them. Her romance with young Andrews failed to end in marriage, with Andrews instead choosing Angeline Stevens to be his wife. The failure of Andrews to follow through with the marriage prompted Ellen White to write that "Annie's disappointment cost her life."

Tuberculosis

Annie contracted tuberculosis and returned home. She died from the disease on Thursday July 26, 1855, at her family's home in West Wilton, New Hampshire.

Hymns and poetry

Some of the hymns she authored include:
Awake, O, awake, now to life and duty
Be patient, be patient, no longer despairing
Blessed Jesus, meek and lowly
Hail, peaceful day, divinely blest
He sleeps in Jesus, peaceful rest
 How Far from Home?
I ask not, Lord, for less to bear, Here in the narrow
 I Saw One Weary 
 Long upon the Mountains
She hath passed death's chilling billow
This groaning earth is too dark and drear
Through this dark valley of conflict
Toil on a little longer here, For thy reward
Twas a doleful night on Calvary's height
Weeping endures but for a night
When darkness gathers round thy way

See also 

 Seventh-day Adventist Church
 Seventh-day Adventist theology
 Seventh-day Adventist eschatology
 History of the Seventh-day Adventist Church
 Ellen G. White
 Adventist
 Seventh-day Adventist Church Pioneers
 Seventh-day Adventist worship

References

External links
 Smith, Annie Rebekah (1828–1855) at Encyclopedia of Seventh-day Adventists
 
 
Graybill, Ron. Annie Smith, Her Life and Love. Review and Herald, April 1, 1976, pp. 4-7 Accessed April 10, 2011
Graybill, Ron. Annie Rebekah Smith, Early Adventist Hymnist. Lest We Forget. Getting to Know the People Who Helped Shape the Seventh-day Adventist Church. An Integrated Unit by Larry Robbins. North American Division Teacher Bulletin. pp. 53-66
The Blessed Hope: The life and death of Annie Smith. An Adventist Heritage Play Accessed April 10, 2011
Hymn Time's Annie Rebekah Smith (1828-1855) Accessed April 10, 2011
Smith, Annie R. (1855) Home Here, and Home in Heaven with other Poems. Rochester, N.Y. Published at the Advent Review Office
Poems by Annie Rebekah Smith Accessed April 10, 2011
Smith, Rebekah. Poems: With a Sketch of the Life and Experience of Annie R Smith. Manchester, N.H.: John B. Clark, 1871. Accessed April 11, 2011
Smith, Rebekah. Poems: With a Sketch of the Life and Experience of Annie R Smith. Manchester, N.H.: John B. Clark, 1871. Archive Facsimile Accessed April 11, 2011
 Nembhard, Judith P. Annie Smith’s Hymns of the Blessed Hope. Review and Herald, August 28, 1986. pp. 12-14. At the time of writing, Judith P. Nembhard was assistant professor of English at Howard University, Washington, D.C.
 Nix, James R. Annie Smith: Pioneer Poet. December 17, 1987, Review and Herald, p. 17.

1828 births
1855 deaths
American Seventh-day Adventists
19th-century American poets
People from Wilton, New Hampshire
American women poets
19th-century American women writers
History of the Seventh-day Adventist Church
19th-century deaths from tuberculosis
Tuberculosis deaths in New Hampshire